Santiago, Oaxaca may refer to:

Santiago Amoltepec
Santiago Apoala
Santiago Apóstol
Santiago Astata
Santiago Atitlán
Santiago Ayuquililla
Santiago Cacaloxtepec
Santiago Camotlán
Santiago Chazumba
Santiago Choapam
Santiago Comaltepec
Santiago del Río
Santiago Huajolotitlán
Santiago Huauclilla
Santiago Ihuitlán Plumas
Santiago Ixcuintepec
Santiago Ixtayutla
Santiago Jamiltepec
Santiago Jocotepec
Santiago Juxtlahuaca
Santiago Lachiguiri
Santiago Lalopa
Santiago Laollaga
Santiago Laxopa
Santiago Llano Grande
Santiago Matatlán
Santiago Miltepec
Santiago Minas
Santiago Nacaltepec
Santiago Nejapilla
Santiago Niltepec
Santiago Nundiche
Santiago Nuyoó
Santiago Suchilquitongo
Santiago Tamazola
Santiago Tapextla
Santiago Tenango
Santiago Tepetlapa
Santiago Tetepec
Santiago Texcalcingo
Santiago Textitlán
Santiago Tilantongo
Santiago Tillo
Santiago Tlazoyaltepec
Santiago Xanica
Santiago Xiacuí
Santiago Yaitepec
Santiago Yaveo
Santiago Yolomécatl
Santiago Yosondúa
Santiago Yucuyachi
Santiago Zacatepec
Santiago Zoochila